Nattages is a former commune in the Ain department in eastern France. On 1 January 2016, it was merged into the new commune Parves-et-Nattages.

It contains the ruins of the Chateau Montbel, the romanesque chapel of Chemillieu and a church rebuilt in the 17th century.

Population

See also
Communes of the Ain department

References

Former communes of Ain
Populated places disestablished in 2016